Vladimir Zakharov may refer to:

Vladimir Zakharov (mathematician) (born 1960), Russian mathematician, professor at the Faculty of Computer Science at the Moscow State University
Vladimir E. Zakharov (born 1939), Russian mathematician and theoretical physicist
Vladimir Grigoryevich Zakharov (1901–1956), Soviet composer  
Vladimir Ivanovich Zakharov (born 1961), Belarusian guitarist
Vladimir Mikhailovich Zakharov (1946–2013), Russian choreographer
Vladimir Mikhailovich Zakharov (biologist) (born 1953), Russian biologist, a member of the Civic Chamber of the Russian Federation and the Russian Academy of Sciences

See also
 Vladimir Sakharov (born 1948), former Soviet footballer
 Vladimir Viktorovich Sakharov (1853–1920), general of the Russian Imperial Army